In Sri Lanka, the Leader of the Opposition is the leader of the largest political party in Parliament that is not in government. This is usually the leader of the second-largest party in Parliament. Sajith Premadasa officially took office as Leader of the Opposition on August 20, 2020, after Speaker announces the appointment in parliament.

Privileges of office

Salary
In 2016, the Leader of the Opposition received a salary month and other entitlements of a Member of Parliament.

Other privileges
The leader of the opposition is entitled to an official residence, office, transport and security equal that of a Cabinet Minister.

Order of precedence
In the Sri Lankan order of precedence, the leader of the opposition is ranked at the level of a Cabinet Minister in the order of precedence.

Leaders of the Opposition (1947–present)
Parties

References

External links
Parliament of Sri Lanka - Handbook of Parliament, Leaders of the Opposition

See also
President of Sri Lanka
Prime Minister of Sri Lanka

 
Sri Lanka